The Mark Twain Birthplace State Historic Site is a publicly owned property in Florida, Missouri, maintained by the Missouri Department of Natural Resources, that preserves the cabin where the author Samuel Langhorne Clemens was born in 1835. The cabin is protected within a modern museum building that also includes a public reading room, several of Twain's first editions, a handwritten manuscript of his 1876 novel The Adventures of Tom Sawyer, and furnishings from Twain's Connecticut home. The historic site is adjacent to Mark Twain State Park on a peninsula at the western end of man-made Mark Twain Lake. The cabin was listed on the National Register of Historic Places in 1969.

Samuel Clemens, later known by the pen name Mark Twain, was born in the two-room house on November 30, 1835. The house was rented by his parents Jane Lampton Clemens (1803–1890) and John Marshall Clemens (1798–1847). Clemens spent his first four years here until the family moved to a two-story clapboard house, now memorialized as the Mark Twain Boyhood Home & Museum in Hannibal, Missouri, in 1839.

References

External links 

Mark Twain Birthplace State Historic Site Missouri Department of Natural Resources
Mark Twain State Park and Historic Site Map Missouri Department of Natural Resources

Missouri State Historic Sites
Mark Twain
Protected areas established in 1924
Museums in Monroe County, Missouri
Twain
Twain, Mark
1924 establishments in Missouri
Houses on the National Register of Historic Places in Missouri
Houses in Monroe County, Missouri
Historic house museums in Missouri
Twain, Mark
National Register of Historic Places in Monroe County, Missouri
Homes of American writers